Jacinto Villalba was a Paraguayan football forward who played for Paraguay in the 1930 FIFA World Cup. He also played for Cerro Porteño. In Argentina, he was played for San Lorenzo de Almagro, in 1932 to 1935, and obtain the championship in 1933 with this club.

References

External links
FIFA profile

Paraguayan footballers
Paraguayan expatriate footballers
Paraguay international footballers
Association football forwards
Cerro Porteño players
San Lorenzo de Almagro footballers
1930 FIFA World Cup players
Expatriate footballers in Argentina
Paraguayan expatriate sportspeople in Argentina
Year of birth missing
Year of death missing